The 2017–18 FC SKA-Khabarovsk season is the club's first season in the Russian Premier League, the highest tier of football in Russia. SKA-Khabarovsk will also take part in the Russian Cup, entering at the round of 32 stage.

Season Events
On 20 December 2017, manager Aleksei Poddubskiy become the club's new Sporting Director, with Rinat Bilyaletdinov being appointed as the club's new manager on 12 January 2018. Bilyaletdinov himself resigned as manager on 31 March after taking just 1 point from 4 games. On 3 April 2018 Sergei Perednya was appointed as the club's new manager.

Squad

Transfers

Summer

In:

Out:

Winter

In:

Out:

Competitions

Russian Premier League

Results by round

Results

League table

Russian Cup

Squad statistics

Appearances and goals

|-
|colspan="14"|Players away from the club on loan:
|-
|colspan="14"|Players who left SKA-Khabarovsk during the season:

|}

Goal scorers

Disciplinary record

References

FC SKA-Khabarovsk
SKA-Khabarovsk